Brighten the Corners: Nicene Creedence Edition is a compilation album by Pavement released on December 9, 2008. It contains the band's 1997 album, Brighten the Corners, in its entirety, as well as outtakes and other rarities from that era, some of which had previously been unreleased.

Release
Nicene Creedence Edition was released on December 9, 2008 by Matador Records. The initial pre-order offer also included the band's previously unreleased live album, Live Europaturnén MCMXCVII, on 12" vinyl.

Critical reception

Nicene Creedence Edition was acclaimed by critics.

Track listing

Disc one
Brighten the Corners
 "Stereo"
 "Shady Lane / J Vs. S"
 "Transport Is Arranged"
 "Date w/ IKEA"
 "Old to Begin"
 "Type Slowly"
 "Embassy Row"
 "Blue Hawaiian"
 "We Are Underused"
 "Passat Dream"
 "Starlings of the Slipstream"
 "Fin"
Brighten The Corners outtakes
 "And Then (The Hexx)" (Originally released as the b-side to "Spit on a Stranger" (OLE-384-7) in May 1999, but presented here is the unedited full version, previously unreleased. It was initially planned to be the opening track to Brighten the Corners.)
 "Beautiful as a Butterfly"
 "Cataracts"
Stereo single "Westie Can Drum"
 "Winner of the"
 "Birds in the Majic Industry" (previously unreleased full length vocal version)Spit on a Stranger single (included here since both were recorded and mixed during Brighten the Corners sessions) "Harness Your Hopes"
 "Roll with the Wind"

Disc twoShady Lane single "Slowly Typed"
 "Cherry Area"
 "Wanna Mess You Around"
 "No Tan Lines"BBC Radio One Evening Session, January 15, 1997 "And Then (The Hexx)" (previously unreleased)
 "Harness Your Hopes" (previously unreleased)
 "The Killing Moon" (released on Major Leagues EP)
 "Winner of the" (previously unreleased)Brighten The Corners outtakes "Embassy Row Psych Intro" (previously unreleased)
 "Nigel" (previously unreleased)
 "Chevy (Old to Begin)" (previously unreleased mix)
 "Roll with the Wind (Roxy)" (previously unreleased mix)God Save The Clean: A Tribute to the Clean, Flying Nun Records compilation "Odditty"Tibetan Freedom Concert'' compilation
 "Type Slowly" (live)

KCRW Morning Becomes Eclectic, February 25, 1997
 "Neil Hagerty Meets Jon Spencer in a Non-Alcoholic Bar" (previously unreleased)
 "Destroy Mater Dei" (previously unreleased)
 "It's A Rainy Day, Sunshine Girl"
 "Maybe Maybe"

BBC Radio One John Peel Live Session, August 21, 1997
 "Date w/ IKEA" (previously unreleased)
 "Fin" (previously unreleased)
 "Grave Architecture" (previously unreleased)
 "The Classical" (released on Major Leagues'' EP)

WFNX Studios, February 12, 1997
 "Space Ghost Theme I" (previously unreleased)
 "Space Ghost Theme II" (previously unreleased)

References

2008 compilation albums
Pavement (band) albums
Matador Records compilation albums
Domino Recording Company compilation albums